Victoria Loren Kelly (born December 14, 1992) is an American singer-songwriter and actress. She first gained recognition after posting videos on YouTube as a teenager, and made it through to Hollywood week on the ninth season of American Idol in 2010. Thereafter, she independently released her self-produced debut EP in 2012, Handmade Songs by Tori Kelly.

In 2013, after Scooter Braun became her manager, Kelly signed with Capitol Records. Her second EP and first major-label release, Foreword (2013), followed soon after. Kelly's debut studio album Unbreakable Smile (2015) peaked at number two on the Billboard 200 chart in the United States with its lead single, "Nobody Love", marking her first appearance on the Billboard Hot 100 chart.

Kelly was nominated for Best New Artist at the 58th Grammy Awards, and voiced Meena in the animated film Sing (2016), which she reprises in the 2021 sequel, Sing 2. Her second studio album Hiding Place (2018) peaked at number 35 on the Billboard 200 chart and received two Grammy Awards, for Best Gospel Album and Best Gospel Performance/Song, respectively. In 2019, Kelly released her third studio album Inspired by True Events followed by her fourth studio album in 2020, A Tori Kelly Christmas which also marked her first Christmas album.

Life and career

Early life and career beginnings 
Victoria Loren Kelly was born in Wildomar, California. Her father, Allwyn, is of Afro-Jamaican and Puerto Rican ancestry, while her mother, Laura, is of Irish and German descent. She has a younger brother named Noah. Growing up, she was exposed to a variety of music by her parents. "I give them a lot of credit for just playing all different genres, and no genre was off limits," she said when asked about her upbringing. Kelly is a Christian. Faith plays a part in her songwriting, though she does not consider herself a part of the Christian music genre. Kelly appeared on the show Star Search, but lost to vocalist Tiffany Evans, who won the title of Junior Champion in the junior singer division.

In 2004, she participated on America's Most Talented Kids, singing Christina Aguilera's "Keep on Singin' My Song" and won, beating out musician Hunter Hayes. She made a second appearance on the show in the Tournament of Champions, but lost to Antonio Pontarelli, a rock musician. At age twelve, Kelly accepted a record deal with Geffen Records, but both sides agreed to end the contract due to creative differences. In 2007, Kelly began posting videos to YouTube, at the age of 14. The first video she uploaded was a cover of John Wesley Work Jr.'s "Go Tell It on the Mountain", which she originally performed back in December 2004. Kelly gained recognition for her acoustic cover, with a fellow YouTuber named Angie Girl, of Frank Ocean's "Thinkin Bout You".

Despite failing to reach the top 24 on American Idol, she took a new tack in her music, learning how to play the guitar, composing original song pieces, and recording them herself on her computer. Tori began posting her performances on YouTube, and quickly reached over 1,000,000 subscribers.

2010–2014: Handmade Songs by Tori Kelly and Foreword
In 2010, Tori auditioned for Season 9 of American Idol in Denver, Colorado and made it through to Hollywood Week but did not reach the "Top 24" of the artists. She had claimed that she was 'devastated' but she had given it her all. Afterwards, she was asked to take part in a youth version of the 1985 charity song "We Are the World" titled "We Are the World: The Next Generation". On May 1, 2012, she released her first EP, titled Handmade Songs by Tori Kelly, which was released on her own label, Toraay Records. Kelly wrote, produced, engineered, and recorded the EP by herself in her bedroom. Shortly after its release, the EP made it to the Top 10 Pop Albums list on iTunes. She called the EP a "warm up" to a full-length album that was to come in the future. As of 2013, it had sold more than 14,000 copies and reached number nine on the US Heatseekers Albums chart.

In February 2013, Kelly released a single called "Fill a Heart", which she wrote for the "Child Hunger Ends Here" campaign by ConAgra Foods and Feeding America. The song was later performed by British boy band The Wanted on Dancing With the Stars. Starting in April 2013, Kelly performed at eight venues across continental U.S. for her "Fill a Heart" tour, helping out at the cities' food banks during the day. She has performed in venues such as the Troubador and the Roxy in Los Angeles, the Gramercy Theater in New York and Bush Hall in London. She has also been featured in magazines such as Teen Vogue, Elle and Glamour.

During mid-2013, Kelly's newly assigned manager Scooter Braun introduced her to the heads of Capitol Records. She had been "very skeptical" about signing with a major record label in fear that things would not work out in her favor. "I'd been burned before. But when I met those guys, I had never felt that way: They were fans and really got me." On September 6, 2013, she was signed to Capitol Records.

In September 2013, she was picked as Elvis Duran's Artist of the Month and was featured on NBC's Today show hosted by Kathie Lee Gifford and Hoda Kotb, where she performed live her single "Dear No One". Kelly announced on The Today Show that her major label debut, a second EP, titled Foreword, would be released on October 22, 2013, on Capitol Records. By the end of November the EP had sold more than 16,000 copies, debuting at number 16 on the US Billboard 200. Kelly was the sole supporting act to Ed Sheeran at Madison Square Garden on November 1, 2013, and supported Sam Smith on their In the Lonely Hour UK tour in October 2014. Kelly wrote and recorded a song called "Silent" for The Giver: Music Collection, supporting the film adaptation (The Giver) of the novel The Giver, which was released on iTunes on August 5, 2014. On August 7, 2014, Kelly posted a live acoustic version of the song on her YouTube channel; which has over 2.6 million views as of October 2015.
Kelly was featured on "Lullaby" by British rapper Professor Green, which was released in the United Kingdom on September 14, 2014. The song peaked at number four on the UK Singles Chart, thus providing Kelly with her first top ten song in the United Kingdom.

Kelly was featured on the medley "Winter Wonderland"/"Don't Worry Be Happy" on Pentatonix's album That's Christmas to Me that was released in October 2014. On December 1, 2014, it was announced that Tori Kelly was one of MTV's Artist's To Watch. She privately performed two songs for MTV: "Funny" and "Dear No One"; both can be found on her Artist To Watch page. Her "Funny" performance was aired on MTV for several weeks.

2015–2017: Unbreakable Smile and other projects

Throughout 2014, Kelly worked with Braun on her debut album in which she had contributions from Toby Gad, Max Martin, and Ed Sheeran. The lead single from the album, "Nobody Love", was released on February 8, 2015. It was written by Rickard Goransson, Max Martin, and Tori Kelly herself. Kelly performed "Nobody Love" at the 2015 Billboard Music Awards. The album, entitled Unbreakable Smile, was released on June 23, 2015, and debuted at number two on the Billboard 200. Kelly performed "Should've Been Us" at the 2015 MTV Video Music Awards. In October 2015, Kelly covered the song "Colors of the Wind" from Pocahontas on the We Love Disney album. "Hollow" was released on October 22, 2015 as the first single from the new edition of Unbreakable Smile. In the same month, Kelly became the brand-ambassador of William Rast, the clothing line co-founded by Justin Timberlake. In late 2015, Kelly received a nomination for Best New Artist at the 58th Grammy Awards. She performed at the ceremony with English singer James Bay. She became the first artist in history to perform a Christian pop song at the Grammy Awards.

Kelly recorded an updated version of Amy Grant's 1991 single "Baby Baby", with Grant herself. Commemorating its 25th anniversary, when Kelly was still 23, the song was released on April 29, 2016. Kelly made her cinematic debut in the animated movie Sing (2016), voicing Meena the elephant. On July 10, 2016, Kelly released an original song "Blink of an Eye" to honor her friend Christina Grimmie, on the one-month anniversary of her killing during a meet and greet at The Plaza Live in Orlando, Florida, on June 10, 2016, while on tour with Before You Exit.

On May 7, 2017, Kelly played the Beale Street Music Festival in Memphis, Tennessee opening for Soundgarden at what would be one of their final performances before frontman Chris Cornell committed suicide on May 17. On June 9, Kelly and rapper Lecrae, released the single "I'll Find You", with Kelly as the featured artist. The accompanying music video was released on July 28, 2017. It features various St. Jude Hospital patients, and Kelly and Lecrae singing over a black backdrop. It peaked at No. 11 on the Billboard R&B/Hip-Hop chart, No. 1 on the Hot Christian Songs and No. 17 on the Billboard Bubbling Under Hot 100 chart. She also collaborated with country singer Chris Lane on his single "Take Back Home Girl" which has since charted at No. 57 on the Billboard Hot 100. In September 2017, Kelly announced her engagement to basketball player André Murillo. In December 2017, She performed a memorable version of "Have yourself a Merry little Christmas" with Jacob Collier, posted on YouTube.

2018–2019: Hiding Place and Inspired by True Events
On March 30, 2018, Kelly released the single "Help Us to Love" featuring the HamilTones, which served as the lead single to her second studio album. On May 20, 2018, she announced her and Murillo's marriage in an Instagram post. On August 23, Kelly revealed on her personal Instagram that her album, Hiding Place, would be released on September 14. The second single of the album, "Never Alone", was released on August 24. On September 7, Kelly announced a tour in support of the album. The album won Best Gospel Album and "Never Alone" won Best Gospel Performance/Song at the 61st Annual Grammy Awards.

On January 18, 2019, Kelly announced that she would be going on The Acoustic Sessions tour starting in February. Tickets went on sale on January 25 along with the release of her new lead single "Change Your Mind" for her upcoming third studio album. On June 26, 2019, Kelly announced her third studio album Inspired by True Events which was released on August 9, 2019.

2020–present: A Tori Kelly Christmas, other work and new record label
On July 22, 2020, Kelly released a cover of Drake's "Time Flies" as the first single of her EP Solitude. On August 11, three days before the EP's release, Kelly released "Unbothered" as the second single. Kelly released Solitude on August 14 which includes four original songs which she wrote while in quarantine during the coronavirus pandemic. On July 30, 2020, Kelly was featured on Jacob Collier's "Running Outta Love", from his album Djesse Vol. 3. A version for The Late Show with Stephen Colbert was released on August 3.

On October 7, Kelly announced a Christmas album, A Tori Kelly Christmas, which was released on October 30. The album was produced by Babyface. Two extra songs, another original and a cover of "All I Want for Christmas Is You", were released as bonus tracks exclusively at Target. In late 2020, Kelly also competed on season 4 of The Masked Singer as "Seahorse". Kelly made it to the semi-finals of the competition, before being unmasked in a triple elimination alongside Chloe Kim as "Jellyfish" and Taylor Dayne as "Popcorn".

In 2021, Kelly recorded a cover of "Waving Through a Window" for the soundtrack album of the 2021 film adaptation of Dear Evan Hansen, produced by Justin Goldner. On November 2, 2021, she published her first book, The Curly Girl Blues. That same year, she reprised her role as Meena in Sing 2.

Artistry

Kelly has a three-octave light-lyric soprano vocal range.

Discography

 Unbreakable Smile (2015)
 Hiding Place (2018)
 Inspired by True Events (2019)
 A Tori Kelly Christmas (2020)

Tours 
Headlining

 Where I Belong Tour (2015)
 Unbreakable Tour (2016)
 Hiding Place Tour (2018)
 The Acoustic Sessions Tour (2019)

Supporting

 Sam Smith – In the Lonely Hour Tour (2015)

Filmography

Film

Television

Awards and nominations

The following is a list of awards and nominations received by Tori Kelly.

Awards

Personal life
Kelly married André Murillo, a professional basketball player in Germany, in 2018.

Kelly is a practicing Christian.

Notes

References

External links

 
 
 

1992 births
Living people
21st-century American singers
21st-century Christians
21st-century American women singers
American child singers
American Christians
American women singer-songwriters
American Idol participants
American people of German descent
American people of Irish descent
American people of Jamaican descent
American people of Puerto Rican descent
American people of Trinidad and Tobago descent
American soul singers
American gospel singers
American voice actresses
Christians from California
Grammy Award winners
People from Canyon Lake, California
People from Wildomar, California
Schoolboy Records artists
Singer-songwriters from California
American contemporary R&B singers